The Pacific-Antarctic Ridge (PAR) is a divergent tectonic plate boundary located on the seafloor of the South Pacific Ocean, separating the Pacific Plate from the  Antarctic Plate.  It is regarded as the southern section of the East Pacific Rise in some usages, generally south of the Challenger Fracture Zone and stretching to the Macquarie Triple Junction south of New Zealand.

The Louisville Ridge

Stretching for 4,300 km north-west from the Pacific-Antarctic Ridge to the Osbourn Seamount at Tonga and Kermadec Junction
is a long line of seamounts called the Louisville Ridge – the longest such chain in  the Pacific – thought to have formed from the Pacific Plate sliding over a long-lived center of upwelling magma called the Louisville hotspot.

See also
 Hollister Ridge
 Oceanic ridge
 List of tectonic plate interactions

References

Further reading

Underwater ridges of the Pacific Ocean
Underwater ridges of the Southern Ocean
Geology of the Southern Ocean